Paratettix mexicanus, the Mexican pygmy grasshopper, is a species of pygmy grasshopper in the family Tetrigidae. It is found in Central America and North America.

References

External links

 

Tetrigidae
Articles created by Qbugbot
Insects described in 1861